Tomorrow's Leaves is a 2021 hand-drawn Japanese animated short film which is produced by Studio Ponoc. The Olympic Foundation of Culture (OFCH) commissioned Studio Ponoc for this film project to commemorate the Tokyo 2020 Olympics, on ahead of the Olympics' opening ceremony.

Tomorrow's Leaves premiered at the opening Ceremony of Annecy International Animated Film Festival on June 14, 2021. From then, it was shown at the Skytree Round Theatre from July 12, 2021, to September 5, 2021. And lastly, it is scheduled to play in United Cinema Theatre from July 23, 2021, to July 29, 2021. On July 23, 2021, the film was released at the International Olympic Committee website and The Olympic Museum YouTube channel worldwide.

Plot 
The synopsis of the series was published by International Olympic Committee:

References

External links 

 
 

Anime with original screenplays
Japanese animated fantasy films
2021 films
2021 anime films
Anime short films
2020s Japanese films
2021 short films
2020 Summer Olympics